The 2019 Texas A&M Aggies baseball team represents Texas A&M University in the 2019 NCAA Division I baseball season. The Aggies play their home games at Blue Bell Park.

Preseason

Preseason All-American teams

2nd Team
John Doxakis - Starting Pitcher (D1Baseball)

3rd Team
Braden Shewmake - Middle Infielder (Perfect Game)

SEC media poll
The SEC media poll was released on February 7, 2019 with the Aggies predicted to finish in fifth place in the Western Division.

Preseason All-SEC teams

2nd Team
Braden Shewmake - Shortstop
John Doxakis - Starting Pitcher

Roster

Schedule and results

Schedule Source:
*Rankings are based on the team's current ranking in the Collegiate Baseball poll.

Morgantown Regional

Record vs. conference opponents

Rankings

2019 MLB draft

References

Texas AandM
Texas A&M Aggies baseball seasons
Texas AandM Aggies baseball
Texas AandM